Shirley Fong-Torres (November 16, 1946 – June 18, 2011) was a chef, tour operator, and popular travel and food writer based in San Francisco, California, US.

Early life 
Fong-Torres was born on November 16, 1946. Her father was Ricardo Torres. Due to the Chinese Exclusion Act, Fong-Torres' father (born Fong Kwok Seung), changed his surname to Torres and posed as a Filipino in order to immigrate to the United States.  His family later adopted the hyphenated surname, Fong-Torres.

Education 
Fong-Torres was a graduate of the University of California, Berkeley.

Career 
Early in her career, Fong-Torres worked at Levi Strauss and taught middle school. She later founded Wok Wiz Chinatown Tours (1987), which still offers cultural and culinary themed tours to locals and tourists.  She developed the very popular specialty tour "I Can't Believe I Ate My Way Through Chinatown."  Wok Wiz Chinatown Tours continues today, with Shirley's team of talented tour leaders and her daughter, Tina Dong Pavao carrying on her legacy. 

Shirley published four books: "Wok Wiz Chinatown Tour Cookbook" [1988], "San Francisco Chinatown: A Walking Tour" [1991, China Books], “In The Chinese Kitchen With Shirley Fong-Torres” [1993, Pacific View Press], and "The Woman Who Ate Chinatown" [2008].

In 2006, Shirley Fong-Torres appeared on the hit Travel & Living Channel show Cocktail Kings, and inspired mixologist Dimitri Lezinska to create a Margarita style drink named "Diva of Sausalito."

Personal life 
Fong-Torres' brother, Ben Fong-Torres is an American rock journalist, author, and broadcaster.

Fong-Torres died of leukemia on June 18, 2011.

References

External links
wokwiz.com - official site
"The Pied Piper of Chinatown"

1946 births
2011 deaths
Food writers
People from the San Francisco Bay Area
20th-century travel writers
American travel writers